Topper or Toppers may refer to:

Brand names
Harley-Davidson Topper, a motor scooter manufactured from 1960 to 1965
Topper Corp., an American toy manufacturer during 1960s and early 1970s
Topper (sports), a sportswear brand in Argentina and Brazil founded in 1975
Topper (dinghy), a sailing dinghy patented in 1977 by British designer Ian Proctor
Topper's Pizza (Canadian restaurant), a chain founded in 1982 as Mr. Topper's Pizza
Toppers Pizza (American restaurant), a company-owned and franchise chain founded in 1991
Another name for a top hat
Another name for a pencil sharpener in Ireland
Camper shell camper shell

Comics
Topper (comic strip), a general term for a small comic strip published above or below another strip
The Topper (comics), a 1953–1990 British comics periodical
Topper, a minor character in the 1989 American comic strip Dilbert

Film and TV
Topper (film), a 1937 American film based on Thorne Smith's 1926 novel
Topper (TV series), a 1953 American TV series based on the novel and film
Topper, a horse ridden by American western character Hopalong Cassidy in 1939–1954 films
Topper Harley, the lead character in the 1991 American film Hot Shots!
Topper Thornton, the main character in the Netflix series Outer Banks
De Toppers, a Dutch musical supergroup formed in 2005, popular on TV and DVD

Literature
Topper, a minor character in Dickens' 1843 novella A Christmas Carol
Topper, a 1926 novel by American author Thorne Smith

People
Topper (nickname)
Topper (surname)

Places in the United States
Toppertown, Missouri, an unincorporated community also known as Topper
Toppers, Oklahoma, an unincorporated community
Topper Site, an archaeological site in South Carolina

Other uses
The athletics teams of Blue Mountain College, Blue Mountain, Mississippi, United States
Furikake, a food on top of cooked rice